Duneland Beach is an unincorporated community in Michigan Township, LaPorte County, Indiana.

It took its name from the Indiana Dunes.

Geography

Education
Duneland Beach residents are served by the Michigan City Public Library. Duneland Beach residents may also request a free library card from any La Porte County Public Library branch.

References

External links
Duneland Beach Association

Unincorporated communities in LaPorte County, Indiana
Unincorporated communities in Indiana